WJDF (97.3 FM) was a radio station licensed to serve Orange, Massachusetts.  The station was owned by Deane Brothers Broadcasting Corp. It aired a full service classic hits music format.

The station was assigned the WJDF call letters by the Federal Communications Commission (FCC) on June 30, 1995. It signed on in August 1995 with an adult contemporary format. In January 2014, WJDF reformatted to full-service classic hits.

On November 30, 2018, the FCC warned WJDF of a potential for the revocation of their license if their debt was not paid within 60 days; at the time, the station owed $9,642 in regulatory fees dating to 2014. The station did not respond to the warning, and on April 4, 2019, WJDF's license was revoked by the FCC. At the time of the revocation, WJDF had been operated by Steve Wendell under a local marketing agreement, with plans for Wendell to acquire the station outright. Wendell subsequently announced his intention to file a $1.8 million lawsuit against Deane Brothers Broadcasting, as he had not been informed of the station's unpaid regulatory fees (which prevented renewal of the WJDF license and the proposed license transfer); in addition, the station had been silent from August to December 2018 after WJDF's transmitter was destroyed by two lightning strikes.

References

External links

JDF
Mass media in Franklin County, Massachusetts
Radio stations established in 1995
1995 establishments in Massachusetts
Radio stations disestablished in 2019
2019 disestablishments in Massachusetts
Defunct radio stations in the United States
JDF